The 2008 NCAA Division I men's soccer tournament was a tournament of 48 teams from NCAA Division I who played for the NCAA Championship in soccer. The College Cup for the final four teams was held at Pizza Hut Park in Frisco, Texas. All the other games were played at the home field of the higher-seeded team. The final was held on December 14, 2008.

The bracket was announced November 17, 2008. The tournament started on November 21. The first round was played on November 21 and 22, and the second round on the 25th and 26th. The third round was played on November 29 and 30. The Regional Finals were played on December 6. Maryland won the 2008 College Cup, defeating North Carolina, 1–0, in the final. This was Maryland's third College Cup and second since 2005.

Regional 1

Regional 2

Regional 3

Regional 4

College Cup – Pizza Hut Park, Frisco, Texas

Semifinals

Championship

Goal scorers 

Bold indicates player's team played in the final

4 Goals

Andrew Wiedeman- California

3 Goals

Graham Zusi- Maryland
Sverre Wegge Gundhus- St. John's
Chris Leer- UC Davis
Nirav Kadam- UNC Greensboro
Cody Arnoux- Wake Forest
Zack Schilawski- Wake Forest

2 Goals

Tony Cascio- Connecticut
Seth Sinovic- Creighton
John Mellencamp- Indiana
Kirk Urso- North Carolina
Oliver Kupe- Northwestern
Irving Garcia- UC Irvine
Zak Boggs- South Florida
Joel Gustafsson- St. John's
Sam Cronin- Wake Forest
Andrew Hoxie- William and Mary

1 Goal

Matt Tutich- Akron
Shawn Chin- Boston College
Edvin Worley- Boston College
Jin Oh- Boston University
Chris Deal- California
Demitrius Omphroy- California
Davis Paul- California
Ryan Anderson- Cal Poly
Dori Arad- Connecticut
Andrei Gotsmanov- Creighton
Chris Schuler- Creighton
Eber Martinez- George Mason
Andre Akpan- Harvard
John Stamatis- Harvard
Baggio Husidic- Illinois-Chicago
Matt Spiess- Illinois-Chicago
Andy Adlard- Indiana
Eric Alexander- Indiana
Kevin Alston- Indiana
Brad Ring- Indiana
Ofori Sarkodie- Indiana
Nedim Hrustric- Jacksonville
Ramak Safi- Jacksonville
Stefan Runeman- Jacksonville
Tony Taylor- JacksonvilleAaron Clapham- Louisville
Zachary Hernan- Louisville
Ryan McDonald- Louisville
Phil Bannister- Loyola (Md.)Jeremy Hall- MarylandOmar Gonzalez- MarylandCasey Townsend- MarylandRodney Wallace- MarylandPeri Marosevic- Michigan
Jake Stacy- MichiganMichael Callahan- North CarolinaGarry Lewis- North CarolinaBilly Schuler- North CarolinaBrian Shriver- North Carolina'''
Geoff Fallon- Northwestern
Jack Traynor- Notre Dame
Jordan Seabrook- South Florida
Nelson Becerra- St. John's
Tafadzwa Chiduku- St. John's
Kyle Hayes- St. Louis
Austin Neil- Tulsa
Jose Parada- Tulsa
Sule Anibaba- UC Davis
Lance Patterson- UC Davis
Irving Garcia- UC Irvine
Rafael Macedo- UC Irvine
Amani Walker- UC Irvine
Martin Hedevag- UC Santa Barbara
Michael Tetteh- UC Santa Barbara
Tebatso Manyama- UNC Greensboro
Corey Maret- UNC Greensboro
Lyle Adams- Wake Forest
Corben Bone- Wake Forest
Jamie Franks- Wake Forest
Luke Norman- Wake Forest
Marcus Tracy- Wake Forest
Alan Koger- William and Mary
Rafael Araujo- Winthrop

See also
NCAA Men's Soccer Championship

References

Championship
NCAA Division I Mens Soccer
NCAA Division I Men's Soccer Tournament seasons
NCAA Division I men's soccer tournament
NCAA Division I men's soccer tournament
NCAA Division I men's soccer tournament